Ty's Great British Adventure is a British television reality show on Home. produced by UKTV in association with Gallowgate. featuring Ty Pennington of Extreme Makeover: Home Edition fame.

Episodes

Series One
Portreath, Cornwall
1 x 60mins and 4 x 30mins
Filmed: May 2008, Broadcast: 16 September 2008 – 14 October 2008

Pennington attempts to restore the fortunes of a faded seaside resort.

Note: The 60-minute episode from this series aired in the U.S. on ABC on 7 August 2011.

Series Two
Portishead Open Air Pool
5 x 30mins
Filmed: May 2009, Broadcast: 14 September 2009 – 5 October 2009
Ty helps the community of Portishead, in North Somerset, to reopen their derelict open air swimming pool as a community Lido.

Series Three
Kiln Green and Castleholm, Langholm, Scotland
5 x 30 mins
Filmed May 2009, Broadcast Spring 2010
Ty helps a community to build a bandstand, construct a new path, open a tourist centre and put on a music festival.

External links 
 Ty's Great British Adventure Official Site

References

2008 British television series debuts
2010 British television series endings
Makeover reality television series
UKTV original programming